Tazehabad-e Namivand (also Romanized as Tāzehābād-e Nāmīvand; also known as Namiawān, Nāmīvand, Nāmīvand-e ‘Olyā, Nāmīvand-e Vasaţ, Nāmīvand-e Vasaţī, Nām-i-Wān, and Nāmvand-e Vosţā) is a village in Chaqa Narges Rural District, Mahidasht District, Kermanshah County, Kermanshah Province, Iran. At the 2006 census, its population was 107, in 25 families.

References 

Populated places in Kermanshah County